Støv for alle pengene is a 1963 Danish comedy film directed by Poul Bang and starring Søren Elung Jensen, with Dirch Passer.

Cast
Søren Elung Jensen as Hr. Henriksen
Helle Virkner as Bodil Henriksen
Jan Priiskorn-Schmidt as Klaus Henriksen
Dirch Passer as Alf Thomsen
Hanne Borchsenius as Frk. Monalisa Jacobsen
Ove Sprogøe as Thorbjørn Hansen
Bodil Udsen as Rigmor Hansen
Karl Stegger as Tim Feddersen
Karen Lykkehus as Fru Feddersen
Henning Palner as Viggo Svendsen
Beatrice Palner as Lene Svendsen
Asbjørn Andersen as Redaktøren
Paul Hagen as Sælgeren
Elith Foss as Chresten Christensen
Ebba Amfeldt as Oda Christensen
Valsø Holm as Købmanden
Bent Vejlby as Pilot i sprøjtefly
Holger Vistisen as Chaufør i mælkebil
Jørgen Buckhøj as Rundviser på spritfabrikken
Gyda Hansen as Kassedame
Gunnar Strømvad
Lise Thomsen
Povl Wøldike

References

External links

1963 films
1963 comedy films
Danish comedy films
1960s Danish-language films
Films directed by Poul Bang
Films scored by Sven Gyldmark